Antoine Sylvain Kina (born 13 February 1996) is a Belgian field hockey player who plays as a midfielder or forward for Gantoise and the Belgium national team.

He is the son of Belgian field hockey coach Pascal Kina.

Club career
Kina played for Gantoise until 2017, when he moved to the Waterloo Ducks. After one season with the Waterloo Ducks, he returned to Gantoise.

International career
Kina made his debut for the Belgium under-21 side at the 2014 EuroHockey Junior Championship where they finished fourth. He was a part of the Belgium squad that won the silver medal at the 2016 Junior World Cup. In January 2017, he made his debut for the senior national team in a test match against the Netherlands. He was not selected for the 2017 EuroHockey Championship so he played in the 2017 EuroHockey Junior Championship.

Kina was named as the first reserve for the 2018 World Cup. He was called up during the group stages to replace the injured Manu Stockbroekx. In August 2019, he was selected in the Belgium squad for the 2019 EuroHockey Championship. They won Belgium its first European title by defeating Spain 5-0 in the final. On 25 May 2021, he was selected in the squad for the 2021 EuroHockey Championship.

References

External links
 

1996 births
Living people
Sportspeople from Ghent
Belgian male field hockey players
Male field hockey midfielders
Male field hockey forwards
2018 Men's Hockey World Cup players
Waterloo Ducks H.C. players
Men's Belgian Hockey League players
Field hockey players at the 2020 Summer Olympics
Olympic field hockey players of Belgium
Olympic gold medalists for Belgium
Medalists at the 2020 Summer Olympics
Olympic medalists in field hockey
La Gantoise HC players
2023 Men's FIH Hockey World Cup players